The Shadow Ministry of Peter Debnam was the opposition led by Peter Debnam MLA, opposing the Iemma government of the Labor Party in the Parliament of New South Wales. The shadow cabinet was made up of members of the Liberal Party and the National Party of Australia in a Coalition agreement. 

Debnam led from the majority Coalition partner, the Liberal Party and served as leader of the opposition from 1 September 2005 until the 2007 state election. The minority Coalition partner, the National Party was led by  Andrew Stoner MLA during this period. The leader of the opposition in the Legislative Council was Mike Gallacher MLC from the Liberal Party and the deputy leader of the Legislative Council was Duncan Gay MLC from the National Party.

Arrangement

Shadow ministers from the Legislative Assembly

Shadow ministers from the Legislative Council

See also
2007 New South Wales state election
Resignation of John Brogden
Shadow ministry of Barry O'Farrell
Iemma ministry (2005–07)
Iemma ministry (2007–08)

References

Liberal Party of Australia
National Party of Australia
2005 establishments in Australia
2007 disestablishments in Australia
New South Wales-related lists
Debnam